The Protocoleoptera are a paraphyletic group of extinct beetles, containing the earliest and most primitive lineages of beetles. They represented the dominant group of beetles during the Permian, but were largely replaced by modern beetle groups during the following Triassic. Protocoleopterans typically possess prognathous (horizontal) heads, distinctive elytra with regular window punctures, culticles with tubercles or scales, as well as a primitive pattern of ventral sclerites, similar to the modern archostematan families Ommatidae and Cupedidae. They are thought to have been xylophagous and wood boring.

Kirejtshuk et al. (2014) argue that the name "Protocoleoptera" should not be used for the group, as Protocoleoptera  was originally proposed for the family Protocoleidae , now considered a member of the extinct order Protelytroptera (a stem-group of the modern Dermaptera, the earwigs). Because of this, Cai et al. (2022) proposed a replacement name, Alphacoleoptera . In Kirejtshuk (2020), the extinct beetles included in Protocoleoptera  were placed within the suborder Archostemata instead.

Taxonomy 
The taxonomic naming scheme of early beetles currently has no consenus, with several separate classification schemes proposed for higher level-clades within the stem-group. It is generally agreed that Tshekardocoleidae is the earliest diverging group among the major families.

 Coleoptera
 †Coleopsis Kirejtshuk et al., 2014
 †Tshekardocoleidae   (Early Permian)
 †Permocupedidae  (Early Permian-Middle Triassic)
 †Taldycupedidae  (Middle-Late Permian)
 †Ademosynidae 
 †Permosynidae 
 †Rhombocoleidae 
 †Triadocupedidae 
 †Asiocoleidae 
 †Peltosynidae

References

 
Insect suborders
Paraphyletic groups